A bust of Richard Cushing by James Rosati, sometimes called Richard Cardinal Cushing, is installed in Boston's Cardinal Cushing Memorial Park, in the U.S. state of Massachusetts.

Description and history
The bronze sculpture was completed during 1980–1981 and measures approximately 24 x 20 x 16 in. It rests on a red granite base that measures approximately 61 x 24 x 24 in. The work was surveyed as part of the Smithsonian Institution's "Save Outdoor Sculpture!" program in 1996.

See also
 1981 in art

References

1981 establishments in Massachusetts
1981 sculptures
Bronze sculptures in Massachusetts
Busts in Massachusetts
Granite sculptures in Massachusetts
Monuments and memorials in Boston
Outdoor sculptures in Boston
Sculptures of men in Massachusetts